John Joseph Bostock (born 15 January 1992) is an English professional footballer who plays as a midfielder for  club Notts County.

Bostock made his professional debut for Crystal Palace at the age of 15. In 2008, he signed for Tottenham Hotspur for an initial £700,000. He played only four games for Tottenham, none of which were in the Premier League, spending most of his time on loan at various clubs in the English Football League, and later with Toronto FC. In 2013, Bostock was released and moved to Belgium, representing Royal Antwerp and OH Leuven. In summer 2016, he joined French side Lens where he stayed for one and a half seasons.

Born in England, Bostock represented the country up to under-19 level. In 2016, he chose to represent his ancestral Trinidad & Tobago at full international level, although he has yet to appear for them.

Club career

Crystal Palace
Bostock began his career with Crystal Palace at the age of five. At the age of 14 he was offered a contract by Spanish club Barcelona.

Bostock made his league debut on 29 October 2007 at the age of 15 years and 287 days, playing 20 minutes as a substitute for Ben Watson in a 2–0 defeat to Watford at Selhurst Park, making him Palace's youngest ever player. He also became the youngest ever Palace player to start a game, aged 15 years and 295 days, on 6 November 2007 against Cardiff City at Ninian Park.

Tottenham Hotspur

On 30 May 2008, Tottenham Hotspur announced the signing of Bostock on their club website. Crystal Palace later issued a statement denying reports that an agreement had been reached with Tottenham. Tottenham and Crystal Palace entered negotiations over the transfer fee, but agreement could not be reached, leading to the sum being decided at a tribunal. On 9 July, the tribunal declared that Tottenham would pay £700,000 for Bostock, with add-on payments of up to £1.25m dependent on appearances and a further £200,000 should he make his full international debut. A sell-on clause entitled Crystal Palace to 15% of any profit Tottenham makes from any future sale of Bostock's contract. Crystal Palace chairman Simon Jordan said he was so disgusted with Bostock and his stepfather that he intended to revoke and refund their Selhurst Park season tickets for 2008–09, which the pair had already purchased.

Bostock made his first team debut for Spurs in an 8–0 pre-season win over Spanish side Tavernes, providing the cross for Aaron Lennon's opening goal. On 6 November 2008, he made his competitive match debut in the 2008 UEFA Cup game against Dinamo Zagreb, coming on as a substitute, and becoming the youngest player ever to play for Spurs at 16 years, 295 days, just beating the previous record-holder Ally Dick by six days. Bostock made a further two appearances in the UEFA Cup that season, however his career with Tottenham stalled after that and had to wait until January 2012 for his next appearance, in an FA Cup match against Cheltenham Town.

Loan spells
On 13 November 2009, Bostock joined League One club Brentford on loan for a month, he was handed the number 17 shirt immediately. Bostock scored twice on his debut against Millwall

On 6 August 2010, Bostock had joined newly relegated Hull City on a season-long loan. He scored with a 30-yard strike described as a "wonder goal" on his debut against Swansea on 7 August. On 31 December 2010, Tottenham Hotspur announced that Bostock had returned early from his largely unsuccessful loan spell at Hull City.

Bostock joined Sheffield Wednesday on loan on 30 January 2012 for the remainder of the 2011–12 season. He made his debut the following day as a substitute in a 1–1 draw with MK Dons. He was recalled to Spurs in March after playing only four games.

Bostock joined Swindon Town on loan on 22 March 2012 for the remainder of the season, after Tottenham manager Harry Redknapp said it would be good for him to play under Paolo Di Canio. He made his debut on 25 March in the 2012 Football League Trophy Final, which Swindon lost 2–0 to Chesterfield. He made his league debut against Gillingham on 21 April. He made his home debut on 28 April, in a 5–0 win against Port Vale in a game that saw Swindon crowned League Two champions. He made his final appearance on the final day of the season in a 0–0 draw against Bradford.

He returned on loan to Swindon on 30 August 2012 until January 2013. He made his first appearance 2 days later against Preston. He made his home debut on 5 September in the Football League Trophy against rivals Oxford United. Bostock returned to Tottenham on 7 January 2013.

In February 2013, it was reported that Bostock was having trials with two different MLS clubs with a view to a loan move. He officially joined Toronto FC on 8 March, and made his debut for team the following day in a 2–1 home victory over Sporting Kansas City where he was substituted in the 85th minute. On 24 May, Bostock was given a waiver (release) by Toronto, ending his loan stint with the club. On 7 June, the Premier League confirmed that Bostock was one of a number of Premier League players who were being released by their clubs and were now free agents, advertising their availability to other clubs. The official announcement from Tottenham was made on 10 June, which included Bostock, amongst a number of Spurs players who would not be re-signed and were being released.

Royal Antwerp
On 11 July 2013, Bostock joined Royal Antwerp in the Belgian second division under the tutelage of manager Jimmy Floyd Hasselbaink. Despite scoring just one goal he flourished at Antwerp providing 16 assists in his first season and soon became a fans favourite helping the team to finish 6th in the league narrowly missing out on the playoffs.

OH Leuven

His strong performances earned him a move to newly relegated side Oud-Heverlee Leuven, where he continued to blossom. In his second season in Belgium, Bostock went on to help his new side OHL win promotion via the playoffs. Along the way he scooped the Proximus Player of the Season Award after scoring 13 goals and providing 19 assists.

Lens
On 5 July 2016, Bostock joined Ligue 2 team RC Lens on a two-year deal.

On 9 August 2016, Bostock scored his first goal for Lens with a 26th-minute free-kick against AC Ajaccio in the first round of the Coupe de la Ligue. He scored his first league goal for the club in a 2–0 win over Nîmes on 15 August 2016. He scored an eighth-minute penalty in a 1–1 draw with Troyes on 26 August 2016 before scoring twice in a 4–2 win over Orléans on 20 September 2016. He scored his fifth league goal of the season with a penalty against Red Star on 30 September 2016. Bostock was named Ligue 2 player of the month in September and then again in October 2016. He was awarded Ligue 2 player of the year after his first season in French football on 15 May 2017.

Bursaspor
In January 2018, Bostock signed with Süper Lig side Bursaspor, having agreed a -year contract with the club.

Toulouse
In July 2018, Bostock returned to France signing a three-year contract with Toulouse FC, managed by his former Lens boss Alain Casanova.

On 8 August 2019, Bostock returned to England with a season-long loan to Championship side Nottingham Forest.

He left Toulouse by mutual consent in October 2020.

Doncaster Rovers
Bostock joined League One club Doncaster Rovers on an 18-month contract in January 2021. On 1 June 2022, following Doncaster Rovers's relegation from League One, it was announced that he had turned down a new contract and would be leaving the club. He made 39 league appearances for the club.

Notts County
On 7 December 2022, Bostock signed for National League club Notts County on an eighteen-month contract.

International career
Bostock captained England at Under-17 level.

He was eligible to represent England, Trinidad & Tobago and Scotland. In March 2013, the Trinidad and Tobago Football Federation announced that he had shown interest in representing the Soca Warriors at international level. Three years later, on 18 March 2016, he was selected for the double confrontation with Saint Vincent and the Grenadines as part of the 2018 FIFA World Cup qualification CONCACAF Fourth Round.

Personal life
Bostock is a devout Christian. His family support Crystal Palace. As of November 2020 he had been married for ten years and had a young son.

Career statistics

Honours
 Belgian Second Division Player of the Season: 2014–15

References

External links
 
 Tottenham Hotspur player profile

1992 births
Living people
Footballers from Camberwell
Association football midfielders
English footballers
English sportspeople of Trinidad and Tobago descent
Black British sportsmen
English expatriate footballers
English Football League players
National League (English football) players
Major League Soccer players
Belgian Pro League players
Challenger Pro League players
Ligue 1 players
Ligue 2 players
Süper Lig players
Crystal Palace F.C. players
Tottenham Hotspur F.C. players
Brentford F.C. players
Hull City A.F.C. players
Sheffield Wednesday F.C. players
Swindon Town F.C. players
Toronto FC players
Royal Antwerp F.C. players
Oud-Heverlee Leuven players
RC Lens players
Bursaspor footballers
Toulouse FC players
Nottingham Forest F.C. players
Doncaster Rovers F.C. players
Notts County F.C. players
Expatriate soccer players in Canada
Expatriate footballers in Belgium
England youth international footballers
English expatriate sportspeople in Belgium
English expatriate sportspeople in Canada
Expatriate footballers in France
Expatriate footballers in Turkey